Stony Plains, an interim Australian bioregion, comprises , and is part of two state/territories of Australia: the Northern Territory and South Australia.

The bioregion has the code STP. There are seven subregions.

See also

Geography of Australia

References

Further reading
 Thackway, R and I D Cresswell (1995) An interim biogeographic regionalisation for Australia : a framework for setting priorities in the National Reserves System Cooperative Program Version 4.0 Canberra : Australian Nature Conservation Agency, Reserve Systems Unit, 1995. 

Biogeography of the Northern Territory
Biogeography of South Australia
IBRA regions
Deserts of South Australia